The Greek State Film Awards was a part of Thessaloniki International Film Festival concerning exclusively Greek movies. It was one of the most important events in Greek cinema, from its institution in 1992 until 2008.

Until 1991, only Greek movies participated in the Thessaloniki Film Festival. Since 1992 the festival became international and a separate award was instituted for Greek movies. At first the new award was named State Film Awards and later State Film Quality Awards (Κρατικά Κινηματογραφικά Βραβεία Ποιότητας). It was given out by the Greek Ministry of Culture. Apart from the best film award there were awards in other categories such as the best actor, actress, best director etc.

In 2009, during the 50th Thessaloniki Festival, the Greek filmmakers decided to boycott the awards. The awards were subsequently abolished by a bill of the Ministry of Culture. It has since been replaced by the Hellenic Film Academy Awards.

Best film award

Greek state quality film awards (1998-2008)

Greek state film awards (1992-1997)

Best director

Best screenplay

Best actor

Best actress

Best supporting actor

Best supporting actress

Best music

Best cinematography

Best editing

Best production design

Best costumes design

Best sound

Best make up

See also
Thessaloniki Festival of Greek Cinema
Hellenic Film Academy Awards
Greek Film Critics Association Awards

References

External links
Thessaloniki International Film Festival - official website

Greek film awards
1992 establishments in Greece
2009 disestablishments in Greece